Coleophora variicornis is a moth of the family Coleophoridae. It is found from Germany to Italy and from France to Greece.

The length of the forewings is 5.5-6.5 mm for males and 4.5–5 mm for females. Adults have been found on Melilotus officinalis.

The larvae feed on Trifolium pratense.

References

variicornis
Moths of Europe
Moths described in 1952